ESP LTD SC-600 is a guitar model distributed by ESP.

The ESP LTD SC-600 is a 6-string guitar, constructed using Maple neck-thru design and Mahogany body, 24-fret rosewood fingerboard and reverse headstock. It features Seymour Duncan SH-4 pickups at the bridge and Duncan Designed HB-102N at the neck. Single volume and tone-control knobs, in addition to a 3-way toggle pickup switch. Mother-of-pearl SRC inlay at the 12th fret, also standard. It was available in both natural finish and sunburst, but has since been discontinued.

See also
ESP Stephen Carpenter

References

ESP electric guitars